Replicas is a 2018 American science fiction thriller film directed by Jeffrey Nachmanoff, and written by Chad St. John, from a story by Stephen Hamel. The film tells the story of a neuroscientist who violates the law and bioethics to bring his family members back to life after they die in a car accident. It stars Keanu Reeves, Alice Eve and Thomas Middleditch.

It was shown at the Night Visions International Film Festival at Finland in November 2018, and was theatrically released in the United States on January 11, 2019, by Entertainment Studios Motion Pictures. The film received negative reviews from critics, who criticized the writing, plot holes, CGI and acting; it also became a box-office bomb.

Plot 
William Foster and Ed Whittle are biomedical research scientists working for Bionyne Corporation in Puerto Rico, attempting to transfer the mind of a dead soldier into an android with superhuman strength, codenamed Subject 345. Foster specializes in synthetic biology and mapping of the mind's neural pathways, while Whittle's specialty is reproductive human cloning. Foster successfully captures the soldier's neural map and transfers it into the android's synthetic brain, but the experiment fails when the soldier recoils in horror at the android body and destroys it, killing himself again. Foster's boss Jones warns him that if he cannot get Subject 345 to work, the company's shareholders will shut the project down.

Foster takes his wife Mona and three children Sophie, Matt, and Zoe, on a boating trip, but on the way all except William are killed in a car crash. Determined to resurrect his family, he coaxes Ed to bring him the Bionyne equipment necessary to extract his family's neural maps and to clone replacement bodies for them. He successfully extracts their neural maps and tells Whittle to dispose of the bodies, but the first major obstacle to his plan presents itself: only three cloning pods are available, forcing him to choose one to sacrifice. He chooses Zoe, the youngest, and erases her memory from the neural maps of the other three. Whittle starts the seventeen-day cycle required to create mature replacement clones for Foster's family, and tells him he has only that long to solve the problem of integrating the neural maps into the cloned bodies, or else they will start to deteriorate by aging at an abnormally fast rate. Integrating the mind into a biological clone was phase two of the research project, to be solved after android transfer. Foster is forced to keep this secret, since he and Whittle have stolen millions of dollars of Bionyne equipment and are breaking bioethics. He spends the seventeen days removing evidence of Zoe's existence from his home, and creating cover stories of illness to explain his family's absence from work, school, and social media contact.

When Foster notices his wife's central nervous system reacting to his touch, he realizes that Subject 345 failed because the mind expects connection to a biological body with heartbeat and respiration, rather than a synthetic one. He knows now that transfer into the clones will not be a problem, and the failure of android transfer can be solved by programming a simulated mind-body interface to make the android body appear biological. He successfully transfers the minds of his loved ones into the cloned bodies, then goes back to work creating a synthetic mind-body interface. When the next dead body he receives has suffered too much brain damage to be viable, Foster resorts to recording his own mind for the android transfer. Meanwhile, Sophie has a nightmare of her mother's death, and Mona catches Foster erasing her memory of the event. He confesses that they died in a car crash and that he resurrected them. The family soon discovers evidence of Zoe's existence that he missed, and he admits that he couldn't save Zoe and erased their memories of her.

Jones confronts Foster and reveals that he is aware of what Foster and Whittle have done. He tells him the research is not actually intended for medical purposes, but is being financed by the U.S. government to provide a military weapon, and that Foster's family are loose ends to be eliminated. Foster destroys the mind-body interface, incapacitates Jones, and flees, attempting to escape by boat. Jones' henchmen capture Foster's family. He pursues them to Bionyne, where it is clear that Whittle has sold them out. Jones kills Whittle and forces Foster to finish Subject 345. Foster uploads his own mind into Subject 345, who kills the henchmen and mortally wounds Jones. The two Fosters make a deal with Jones: he can live in a cloned body and become rich by working with Foster-345, selling clone transfers to wealthy people looking for a second life. Meanwhile, Foster is able to retire in peace with his family, including the newly cloned Zoe.

Cast 
 Keanu Reeves as William Foster, a research neuroscientist
 Alice Eve as Mona Foster, William’s wife
 Thomas Middleditch as Ed Whittle, a member of William's research team and family friend
 John Ortiz as Jones, William's boss at Bionyne
 Emjay Anthony as Matt Foster, son of William and Mona
 Emily Alyn Lind as Sophie Foster, older daughter of William and Mona
 Aria Leabu as Zoe Foster, younger daughter of William and Mona
 Nyasha Hatendi as Scott, a member of William's research team

Production 
Riverstone Pictures and Remstar Studios co-financed the film, which was produced by Lorenzo di Bonaventura and Stephen Hamel, sharing producing duties with Keanu Reeves, Mark Gao, and Luis A. Riefkohl. Executive producers include James Dodson, Clark Peterson, Maxime Remillard, Bill Johnson, Jim Seibel, Nik Bower, Erik Howsan, Walter Josten, Ara Keshishian, and Deepak Noyar.

Principal photography on the film began on August 10, 2016, in Puerto Rico.

Release
The film was sold to Entertainment Studios for $4 million, after a private screening at the 2017 Toronto International Film Festival. It was then released in the United States on January 11, 2019. The studio spent $10.5 million advertising the film.

Reception

Box office
Replicas grossed $4 million in the United States and Canada, and $5.3 million in other territories, for a total worldwide gross of $9.3 million, against a production budget of $30 million.

In the United States and Canada, Replicas was released alongside the openings of The Upside and A Dog's Way Home, as well as the wide expansion of On the Basis of Sex, and was initially projected to gross $4–7 million in its opening weekend. After making just $950,000 on its first day, including $200,000 from Thursday night previews, estimates were lowered to $3 million. It went on to debut to $2.4 million, finishing 12th at the box office, and marking the worst wide release opening of Reeves' career. The film fell 81.5% in its second weekend to $439,731, the ninth worst second-week drop of all-time.

Critical response
The website's critics consensus reads: "Equal parts plot holes and unintentional laughs, Replicas is a ponderously lame sci-fi outing that isn't even bad enough to be so bad it's good." On Metacritic, the film has a weighted average score of 19 out of 100, based on 15 critics, indicating "overwhelming dislike". Audiences polled by CinemaScore gave the film an average grade of "C" on an A+ to F scale.

Varietys Joe Leydon criticized the film for its "cavernous plot holes, risible dialogue, and ludicrously illogical behavior". Charles Bramesco of The Guardian wrote, "After what may be one hundred hours, the film does not so much end as it stops, the score's wrapping-up tone an evident substitute for closure or resolution."

Since DVD Release (4/2019-->11/2021) Amazon Reviews shows the movie holds 4.1 of 5-Stars rating. (7,762 reviews).

References

External links 
 
 
 

2018 films
American science fiction thriller films
American psychological thriller films
2018 psychological thriller films
2010s science fiction thriller films
Di Bonaventura Pictures films
American dystopian films
Entertainment Studios films
Films about cloning
Films set in Puerto Rico
Films set in Dubai
Films set in the future
Films shot in Puerto Rico
Fundamental Films films
Mad scientist films
2010s English-language films
2010s American films